Merrill George Douglas (born March 15, 1936 in Salt Lake City, Utah) is a former American football running back in the National Football League for the Chicago Bears, Dallas Cowboys, and Philadelphia Eagles. He played college football at the University of Utah.

Early years
Douglas attended Granite High School, before transferring to Olympus High School. He received All-state honors at fullback twice. He accepted a football scholarship from the University of Utah.

As a junior, he became a starter and had 83 carries for 504 yards (second on the team), with a 6.1-yard average and 7 touchdowns. As a senior, he posted 97 carries for 646 yards (second in the league), with a 6.7-yard average and 10 touchdowns, while also leading the conference in scoring. He also lettered in baseball.

In 1988, he was inducted into the Utah Sports Hall of Fame.

Professional career

Chicago Bears
Douglas was selected by the Chicago Bears in the sixth round (65th overall) of the 1958 NFL Draft. He was a backup fullback behind Rick Casares. He was released in 1961.

Dallas Cowboys
On September 7, 1961, he was claimed off waivers by the Dallas Cowboys and played in six games. On April 22, 1962, he was traded to the Cleveland Browns in exchange for offensive tackle Ed Nutting.

Cleveland Browns
On September 10, 1962, he was waived by the Cleveland Browns. He was one of the team's final two cuts as it trimmed its roster to 36, the regular season limit at the time.

Philadelphia Eagles
On September 18, 1962, he was signed as a free agent by the Philadelphia Eagles. He was the third-string fullback.

New York Jets
On September 3, 1963, he was released by the New York Jets.

Personal life
Douglas was a side judge in the NFL for eleven seasons from 1981 through 1991, wearing uniform number 102. He worked for the Salt Lake County Sheriff's Department for 25 years.

References

1936 births
Living people
Sportspeople from Salt Lake City
Players of American football from Salt Lake City
American football running backs
Utah Utes football players
Chicago Bears players
Dallas Cowboys players
Philadelphia Eagles players
National Football League officials